Lance Williams (born June 19, 1980) is an American former professional basketball player.

References

External links
 ABA League Profile 
 Eurocupbasketball.com Profile
 TBLStat.net Profile

1980 births
Living people
A.E.L. 1964 B.C. players
African-American basketball players
American expatriate basketball people in Bosnia and Herzegovina
American expatriate basketball people in Greece
American expatriate basketball people in Poland
American expatriate basketball people in Saudi Arabia
American expatriate basketball people in Turkey
American expatriate basketball people in Uruguay
Bandırma B.İ.K. players
Centers (basketball)
DePaul Blue Demons men's basketball players
İstanbul Teknik Üniversitesi B.K. players
Kauhajoen Karhu players
KK Igokea players
Rockford Lightning players
Basketball players from Chicago
Türk Telekom B.K. players
American men's basketball players
21st-century African-American sportspeople
20th-century African-American people